The Skinny is a 2016 web series starring Jessie Kahnweiler and Illeana Douglas and produced by Joey Soloway.

Overview
A feminist YouTube personality struggles with bulimia.

References

External links

2016 American television series debuts
English-language television shows
American comedy web series
Feminist mass media